How to Measure a Planet? is the fifth studio album by the Dutch rock band The Gathering. It was released as a double CD on 9 November 1998 by Century Media Records. The album was recorded at Bauwhaus Studios, Amsterdam, and Wisseloord Studios, Hilversum, between July and October 1998 under the guidance of producer Attie Bauw.

The theme of space travel runs through many of the songs on the album as well as on the cover and CD booklet.

The track "Liberty Bell" was released as a single in Europe, as well as in Canada on a bonus CD distributed with issue 12 of the metal magazine Brave Words & Bloody Knuckles.

Upon release, the album received positive reviews from critics who appreciated the band's absorption of newfound elements of shoegaze and trip hop into its sound. However, many fans of the more metallic side of the group were not so pleased and it sold about two-thirds as much as its two predecessors (although some slippage should have been expected, given it was a more expensive two-CD package). Many of the Gathering's fans did stay with the band and, as the members have said, it brought them a whole new fanbase.

How to Measure a Planet? remains something of a high point for the Gathering, with tracks from the album making up the majority of their two subsequent live albums, Superheat (2000) and Sleepy Buildings (2004).

In Japan, a one-CD version of the album was released, omitting the nearly half-hour title track.

Background 
Having already achieved some moderate success with Mandylion and Nighttime Birds, the group felt trapped in an artistically controlled corner, which was very limited due to the high expectations from their fan base.

Following the departure of guitarist Jelmer Wiersma, the remaining members of The Gathering decided they needed a change in musical direction. Having only one guitar player implied more space for different elements. Acknowledging the likes of Radiohead's OK Computer and Massive Attack's Mezzanine, and the growing influence of such shoegaze bands as Slowdive, the spacey psychedelia of bands as Motorpsycho, and the more ethereal sounds of 4AD bands such as Dead Can Dance, the group took the opportunity to experiment with their sound and reinvent themselves.

Under guidance from producer Attie Bauw, the band embraced innovative recording techniques and a will to experiment, turning away from the standard structuring of their previous recordings. The group developed a different sound, less bombastic, more transparent, which vastly expanded the group's creative spectrum and style.

Track listing

Personnel 
The Gathering
 Anneke van Giersbergen – lead vocals, guitars on tracks 1.4 and 2.3
 René Rutten – guitars, didgeridoo on track 2.1, theremin on track 2.2
 Frank Boeijen – keyboards
 Hugo Prinsen Geerligs – bass
 Hans Rutten – drums

Production
Attie Bauw – producer, engineer, mixing, programming, some percussion, arrangements with The Gathering
Chris Blair – mastering at Abbey Road Studios, London

Charts

References 

1998 albums
The Gathering (band) albums
Century Media Records albums